Parliamentary elections were held in Serbia on 11 June 1906. The result was a victory for the People's Radical Party, which won 91 of the 160 seats. Nikola Pašić remained Prime Minister.

Results

References

Serbia
Parliamentary
Elections in Serbia
Serbia